The Scholar and Feminist Online is an online academic journal covering feminist theories and movements. It is published triannually by the Barnard Center for Research on Women and was established in January 2003. The journal makes extensive use of multimedia elements and recruits a guest editor from outside Barnard College for each issue.

In May 2003, director Janet Jakobsen told the Chronicle of Higher Education: "Our mission was to act as a combination of public feminism and academic feminism... The Internet opens up possibilities that just wouldn't be there in the print format".

References

External links 
 

Publications established in 2003
English-language journals
Triannual journals
Gender studies journals
Barnard College